Stöð 1 was an Icelandic television channel launched free-to-air on October 29, 2010. The channel targeted a demographic between 25 and 55 years of age and was available to 98% of homes in Iceland. The channel aired various content mostly movies back-to-back. The channel also allowed viewers in Iceland to view the channel on digital television providers and from the official website stod1.is.

References

External links
 Official Site

Television channels in Iceland
Television channels and stations established in 2010
Companies based in Reykjavík